Ram Carlo T. Sharma (born September 20, 1980 in Makati, Philippines) is a professional basketball player who last played for the Pilipinas MX3 Kings in the ASEAN Basketball League. He was drafted by Shell twelfth overall in the 2004 PBA draft.

Professional career

Shell
He was originally drafted by the defunct Shell Turbo Chargers in the 2004 PBA draft. He was rarely used by the team that had Billy Mamaril, Tony dela Cruz and former defensive player awardee Chris Jackson.

Red Bull
He was signed by the Red Bull Barako during the 2006–07 PBA season. His game became more solid under Yeng Guiao. He gained more minutes when the Barako traded Enrico Villanueva to the San Miguel Beermen. He became a candidate for the most improved player award which Gary David eventually won. Sharma averaged 8.8 points per game and 6.1 rebounds per game in 21 minutes. He was part of Guiao's big men rotation with Mick Pennisi and Michael Hrabak the following seasons.

Burger King / Air21
On May 29, 2009, Barako Bull traded him to the Air21 Express (then known as the Burger King Whoppers) in exchange for Chad Alonzo.

Petron Blaze Boosters
After two and a half seasons with the Express, he, Dondon Hontiveros and the third pick in the 2011 PBA draft (which turned to be Chris Lutz) were traded to the Petron Blaze Boosters for Mick Pennisi, Sunday Salvacion and the eight pick in the 2011 draft (which turned out to be Allein Maliksi.

Pacquiao Powervit Pilipinas Aguilas / Pilipinas MX3 Kings
In October 2015, Sharma was signed by the Pacquiao Powervit Pilipinas Aguilas (now the Pilipinas MX3 Kings) of the ABL to play as one of the team's local players. However, on November the same year, he was released by the team after a roster overhaul.

Personal
Sharma is the half-brother of former UAAP MVP and former teammate Rabeh Al-Hussaini.

References

External links
 Player Profile at PBA-Online!

1980 births
Living people
Centers (basketball)
Power forwards (basketball)
Filipino men's basketball players
Swedish people of Filipino descent
Filipino people of Indian descent
People from Makati
Basketball players from Metro Manila
De La Salle Green Archers basketball players
Shell Turbo Chargers players
Barako Bull Energy Boosters players
Barako Bull Energy players
San Miguel Beermen players
Meralco Bolts players
Air21 Express players
NorthPort Batang Pier players
Shell Turbo Chargers draft picks